La Biographie de Luka Philipsen is Keren Ann’s first album.  The name "Luka Philipsen" is derived from Suzanne Vega's song "Luka" and Keren Ann's grandmother's last name.

Track listing 
 "Dimanche en hiver" (Ann, Benjamin Biolay) - 3:51
 "Dans ma ville" (Ann, Biolay) - 3:05
 "Seule" (Ann, Biolay) - 3:30
 "On est loin" (Ann, Biolay) - 3:42
 "Sur le fil" (Ann, Biolay) - 4:38
 "Peut-être" (Ann) - 3:14
 "Reste là" (Ann, Biolay) - 3:05
 "Décrocher les étoiles" (Ann, Biolay) (duet with Benjamin Biolay) - 3:53
 "Jardin d'hiver" (Ann, Biolay, Henri Salvador) - 2:58
 "Aéroplane" (Ann, Biolay) - 3:52
 "Deux" (Ann) - 3:18
 "Mercenaires" (Ann, Biolay) - 3:39
 "Autour de l'arbre" (Ann, Biolay) - 3:46

Personnel 
 Keren Ann: Vocal, Guitar, Piano, Clarinet
 Benjamin Biolay: Electric & Acoustic Guitars, Keyboards & Piano, Trombone, Trumpet
 Lionel Gaillardin: Electric & Acoustic Guitars, Drum Programming
 Laurent Vernerey: Bass
Francky Moulet: Bass
 David Maurin: Drums
 Karen Brunon, Christophe Morin: Celli
 Orchestra (Guy Arbion, J.B. Beauchamps, Christophe Briquet, Isabelle Sajot, Lucien Schmit, Sébastien Surel) & Choir Arranged & Conducted By Benjamin Biolay

References 

Keren Ann albums
2000 debut albums